Box Office is the debut studio album by American drag performer and musician Aja, released on February 7, 2019. "Jekyll & Hyde" was released as a single to promote the album. Cupcakke, Lady Luck, Rico Nasty, and Shea Couleé are featured as guests.

Background and release
Aja first came to international recognition when she was announced as a competitor on the ninth season of the drag reality competition show RuPaul's Drag Race in 2017. Later that same year, Aja was announced as one of the competitors on the third season of RuPaul's Drag Race All Stars, which premiered in January 2018.

After her two appearances on Drag Race, Aja turned her attention to music and released several singles, culminating in the eventual release of her debut extended play, In My Feelings in May 2018. In December of that year, Aja released "Jekyll & Hyde" which was later revealed as the lead single from her debut studio album. Box Office was eventually released by Aja independently in February 2019. Prior to the album's release, Aja announced she no longer wished to be known as a drag queen, instead focusing on her career as a rapper and entertainer.

Track listing

References

External links
 Box Office at Aja's official website

2019 albums
Aja (entertainer) albums